The Untamed is a 2016 science fiction horror film written and directed by Amat Escalante. It was selected to compete for the Golden Lion at the 73rd Venice International Film Festival, with Escalante winning the Silver Lion for his direction.

Plot
A young mother of two, Alejandra, is unhappy in her marriage to her husband Ángel, who is in a secret affair with Alejandra's brother, a nurse named Fabian. In public however, Ángel makes fun of Fabian and gays in general. Alejandra is desperately unhappy in her marriage and extremely sexually frustrated. While in the shower, she masturbates and almost reaches an orgasm until her kids knock on the door, interrupting her.

Veronica is a young woman who is sexually infatuated with a tentacled alien creature originating from a crashed meteor that an elderly couple keep in a barn in the countryside. She has been visiting the alien for years, having sexual encounters where the creature brings her to orgasm. Having never injured her in the past, the creature suddenly bites her in the abdomen. At the hospital, she is cared for by Fabian, and makes friends with him. When she tells the older couple she wants to continue visiting the alien, they forbid it, as it has become dangerous for her.

Ángel visits Fabián and angrily demands to know why Fabian has not answered his texts. Fabián informs him that their affair is over. Veronica entices Fabián to visit the barn, but later Fabián is found naked in a field, sexually assaulted and beaten into a coma. As he lays in the hospital, Alejandra finds his phone and reads the angry texts from Ángel, where Ángel demands sex from him, threatening violence. Ángel is arrested at work, and Alejandra testifies against him, as does one of Fabián's co-workers who witnessed their disputes.

Veronica brings Alejandra to the farm, where the couple tell her about how the alien arrived when something from the sky made a crater in a field near the farm. In the crater, animals of all sorts are wildly copulating. Alejandra is drugged by the couple and escorted into the barn, where the alien pleasures her. She continues to visit the barn, even sometimes bringing her kids along when she can't find anyone to watch them for her; they play outside while she has sex with the creature in the room. The elderly couple become increasingly concerned by the creature's capacity for violence. Veronica attempts to form a sexual relationship with a man, but he cannot satisfy her as the creature did.

Ángel's wealthy parents use their influence to have their son released from jail, posting bail by selling his house. They berate him for embarrassing them so badly, and insist he leave town and never return. Instead, he visits Alejandra in hopes of reuniting his family. She tells him that she now knows he didn't hurt Fabian, but he hits her when she says that they are done. When he tries to pull a gun on her, he accidentally shoots himself in the leg. Alejandra helps him into her truck, but drives into the countryside. She drags a semi-conscious Ángel into the barn, where she finds Veronica dead. As Alejandra leaves, the creature lowers itself from the ceiling towards Ángel.

Later, the older man and Alejandra dump the bodies of Veronica and Ángel into a pit, where Alejandra comments on how rapidly the dead bodies are piling up in the pit.

Cast
 Ruth Ramos as Alejandra / Wife / Fabián's sister
 Simone Bucio as Verónica / Fabián's girlfriend
 Jesús Meza as Ángel / Husband
 Eden Villavicencio as Fabián / Male nurse / Alejandra's brother
 Andrea Peláez	as Madre de Angel / Angel's mother
 Oscar Escalante as Sr. Vega
 Bernarda Trueba as Marta Vega
 Fernando Corona as Person in the market
 Kenny Johnston as Coleman

Reception

Critical response
On review aggregator website Rotten Tomatoes, the film has an approval rating of 86% based on 72 reviews, with an average rating of 7.05/10. The site's critics' consensus reads: "The Untamed attempts some ambitious tonal juggling between fantastical and disturbing -- and draws viewers in with its slippery, inexorable pull." On Metacritic, the film has an aggregated score of 72 out of 100 based on 19 critics, indicating "Generally favorable reviews".

References

External links
 

2016 films
2016 drama films
2010s horror drama films
2016 LGBT-related films
Mexican horror drama films
Danish horror drama films
2010s Spanish-language films
Films directed by Amat Escalante
Mexican LGBT-related films
Danish LGBT-related films
LGBT-related horror drama films
2010s Mexican films